Jonas Weik (born 21 March 2000) is a German footballer who plays as a midfielder for VfB Stuttgart II. He has previously played in the 3. Liga with Waldhof Mannheim.

References

External links
 
 

2000 births
People from Schwetzingen
Sportspeople from Karlsruhe (region)
Footballers from Baden-Württemberg
Living people
German footballers
Association football midfielders
SV Waldhof Mannheim players
FC Astoria Walldorf players
VfB Stuttgart II players
3. Liga players
Regionalliga players
Oberliga (football) players